In Micronesian mythology, Lugeilan is the father of the god Olifat.

References

Micronesian deities